Zemen Knoll (Zemenska Mogila \'ze-men-ska mo-'gi-la\) is a peak of 453 m in the Vidin Heights on Varna Peninsula, Livingston Island in the South Shetland Islands, Antarctica.  The knoll overlooks Kaliakra Glacier to the southeast, and Saedinenie Snowfield to the northwest and west.  The feature is named after the town of Zemen in Western Bulgaria.

First ascent by Lyubomir Ivanov from Camp Academia on 25 December 2004, as part of Tangra 2004/05 survey.

Location

The knoll was mapped by Bulgaria in 2005 and 2009 from the Tangra topographic survey of 2004/05.

Maps
 L.L. Ivanov et al. Antarctica: Livingston Island and Greenwich Island, South Shetland Islands. Scale 1:100000 topographic map. Sofia: Antarctic Place-names Commission of Bulgaria, 2005.
 L.L. Ivanov. Antarctica: Livingston Island and Greenwich, Robert, Snow and Smith Islands. Scale 1:120000 topographic map. Troyan: Manfred Wörner Foundation, 2010.  (First edition 2009. )
 Antarctic Digital Database (ADD). Scale 1:250000 topographic map of Antarctica. Scientific Committee on Antarctic Research (SCAR). Since 1993, regularly updated.
 L.L. Ivanov. Antarctica: Livingston Island and Smith Island. Scale 1:100000 topographic map. Manfred Wörner Foundation, 2017. 
 A. Kamburov and L. Ivanov. Bowles Ridge and Central Tangra Mountains: Livingston Island, Antarctica. Scale 1:25000 map. Sofia: Manfred Wörner Foundation, 2023.

References
 Zemen Knoll. SCAR Composite Gazetteer of Antarctica
 L.L. Ivanov, Livingston Island: Tangra Mountains, Komini Peak, west slope new rock route; Lyaskovets Peak, first ascent; Zograf Peak, first ascent; Vidin Heights, Melnik Peak, Melnik Ridge, first ascent, The American Alpine Journal, 2005, 312–315.
 Bulgarian Antarctic Gazetteer. Antarctic Place-names Commission. (details in Bulgarian, basic data in English)

External links
 Zemen Knoll. Copernix satellite image

Hills of Livingston Island